CIA Security v Signalson and Securitel (1996) C-194/94 is an EU law case, concerning the conflict of law between a national legal system and European Union law.

Facts
Signalson and Securitel publicly claimed that a competitor, CIA Security, had acted contrary to a Belgian law of 1990, which required security firms to get government authority to operate, and a decree in 1991 that alarm systems be authorised. Directive 83/189 said all ‘technical regulations’ had to be notified to the Commission, and some provisions would not come in force for specified periods. The Belgian 1990 law and 1991 decree had not been notified. CIA Security sought an order to prevent Signalson and Securitel making statements that it did not comply with the law. They counterclaimed that CIA did not comply with Belgian law. CIA argued that because the 1990 law and 1991 decree was not notified, it did not apply.

Judgment
The ECJ held that the Belgian Law of 1990 was not a ‘technical regulation’ that needed to be notified, but the 1991 decree was, and should have been notified. Therefore the Belgian courts were not entitled to apply the 1991 decree. It followed that CIA Security was capable of invoking EU law to assert that Signalson and Securitel should not allege it was in breach of the Belgian decree of 1991.

See also

European Union law

Notes

References

Court of Justice of the European Union case law
1996 in case law